Jan Bielecki may refer to:

 Jan Krzysztof Bielecki (born 1951), Polish politician and economist
 Jan Bielecki (athlete) (born 1971), Danish athlete